Mazurenko is a Ukrainian-language surname. It may refer to:

Aleksey Mazurenko (1917–2004), Soviet military pilot, twice Hero of the Soviet Union
Oleh Mazurenko (born 1977), Ukrainian footballer and football manager
Olena Mazurenko (born 1969), Ukrainian footballer

See also
 

Ukrainian-language surnames